This is a list of seasons completed by the Georgia Tech Yellow Jackets football team of the National Collegiate Athletic Association (NCAA) Division I Football Bowl Subdivision (FBS). Since the team's creation in 1892, the Yellow Jackets have participated in more than 1,100 officially sanctioned games, including 39 bowl games.

The Yellow Jackets have been a member of numerous athletic conferences. In 1894, Tech was a founding member of the now defunct Southern Intercollegiate Athletic Association, where it won a national championship in 1917. In 1922, the Yellow Jackets joined the Southern Conference as a founding member, where it won a national championship in 1928. In 1933, Tech joined the Southeastern Conference as a founding member, where it won a national championship in 1952. From 1964 to 1978, the Yellow Jackets competed as an independent. In 1979, Georgia Tech joined the Atlantic Coast Conference, where it has been a member ever since.

Seasons

Notes

References

Georgia Tech Yellow Jackets

Georgia Tech Yellow Jackets football seasons